San Cristóbal is a neighbourhood on the southern outskirts of Madrid, belonging to the working-class district of Villaverde, of which it is an administrative ward. The growing immigration rate (over 45% in 2007) has boosted its population to 18,000 inhabitants.

The neighbourhood is geographically isolated by the railroads and highways that create borders, but has a Madrid Metro stop on Line 3 at San Cristóbal station.

San Cristóbal is home to the Puente de Colores open-air social centre, built from 2012–2014 and a community urban renewal project. Raul, the Real Madrid legend, was born in this joint.

Personalities
Spanish footballer Raúl González grew up around San Cristóbal de los Ángeles. He played at the local club and was spotted by Atlético Madrid. From 1994 to 2010 he played for Real Madrid.

References

Wards of Madrid
Villaverde (Madrid)
Working class in Europe